XobotOS is a Xamarin research project that explored porting Android 4.0 from Java/Dalvik to C# to explore the performance and memory footprint benefits of C#.

XobotOS is a semi-automated port of the Android 4.0 source code from Java to C#.  The automated parts were ported using an improved version of Sharpen that can compile more advanced Java constructs and supports generics.  Most of the manual bits of code fall in two categories (a) code to integrate with the host operating system and (b) replace the Java JNI code used to call into C, with the ECMA CLI P/Invoke functionality.

References

Android (operating system) software